"Arthur's Theme (Best That You Can Do)" is a song performed and co-written by American singer-songwriter Christopher Cross, which was the main theme for the 1981 film Arthur starring Dudley Moore and Liza Minnelli. The song won an Oscar for Best Original Song in 1981. In the US, it reached number one on the Billboard Hot 100 and on the Hot Adult Contemporary charts during October 1981, remaining at the top on the Hot 100 for three consecutive weeks. Overseas, it also went to number one on the VG-lista chart in Norway and was a top-ten hit in several other countries. The song became the second and last American number-one hit by Christopher Cross. It was included as a bonus track only on the CD and cassette versions of his second album, Another Page, released in 1983.

The B-side of the record, "Minstrel Gigolo", was the same song used on the back of Cross' debut single, "Ride Like the Wind".

Background
The song was written in collaboration between Cross, pop music composer Burt Bacharach, and Bacharach's frequent writing partner and then-wife Carole Bayer Sager. A fourth writing credit went to Minnelli's ex-husband, Australian songwriter Peter Allen, a frequent collaborator with Bayer Sager.  The line in the chorus "When you get caught between the moon and New York City" was taken from an unreleased song written by Allen and Bayer Sager. Allen came up with the line while his plane was in a holding pattern during a night arrival at John F. Kennedy International Airport.

The song won the 1981 Academy Award for Best Original Song and Golden Globe Award for Best Original Song. In 2004 it finished at No. 79 in AFI's 100 Years...100 Songs survey of the top tunes in American cinema.

Music video
The music video consists of two acts, which are edited together in fade outs. In one, Christopher Cross performs the song with musicians in a recording studio, and the other is the story the song illustrates.

Personnel 
 Christopher Cross – lead and backing vocals, guitar
 Michael Omartian – keyboards, synthesizers, string arrangements
 Michael Boddicker – synthesizer programming
 Steve Lukather – guitar
 Marty Walsh – guitar 
 David Hungate – bass
 Jeff Porcaro – drums
 Paulinho da Costa – percussion
 Ernie Watts – saxophone

Charts and certifications

Charts

Year-end charts

All-time charts

Certifications

See also

List of Hot 100 number-one singles of 1981 (U.S.)
List of number-one adult contemporary singles of 1981 (U.S.)
List of number-one hits in Norway

References

Film theme songs
1980s ballads
1981 songs
1981 singles
Christopher Cross songs
Liza Minnelli songs
Best Original Song Academy Award-winning songs
Best Original Song Golden Globe winning songs
Billboard Hot 100 number-one singles
Cashbox number-one singles
Number-one singles in Norway
Oricon International Singles Chart number-one singles
Songs with music by Burt Bacharach
Songs written by Carole Bayer Sager
Songs written by Christopher Cross
Songs written by Peter Allen (musician)
Songs about New York City
Warner Records singles